The Große Schlenkerspitze is a mountain in the Lechtal Alps in the Austrian state of Tyrol. At  or, according to other sources, 2,831 m, it is the highest peak in the eastern part of the Lechtal Alps.

Summit block 
The massif of the Schlenkerspitze is a rock wall of main dolomite over two kilometres long. Its north arête drops down to the saddle of Galtseitejoch, its southwest arête links the Große Schlenkerspitze to the Kleine Schlenkerspitze and then drops into the Hintere Dremelscharte col. The east arête joins it to the Brunnkarspitze. The entire Schlenker massif is brittle and ruptured, the arêtes bristle with innumerable pinnacles because the rock strata are vertical here.

First ascent 
The Große Schlenkerspitze was first ascended in 1882 from the Galtseitenjoch saddle by Spiehler and Friedel; the Kleine Schlenkerspitze via the southeast arête in 1896 by Ampferer and W. Hammer.

Tours 
 From Galtseitejoch, 2,423 m, via the north arête, grade II+, 2 hours
 Southeast face, III, 4 hours
 East face, IV+, 3 hours
 West gully and southwest face, described as very difficult to find, grade III, 4 hours, mostly very crumbly.
 Ascents of the Kleine Schlenkerspitze are all difficult, grade III to IV.

Literature 
 Heinz Groth, Alpine Club guide Lechtaler Alpen, Bergverlag Rother, Munich

Mountains of the Alps
Two-thousanders of Austria
Mountains of Tyrol (state)
Lechtal Alps